Lithuania is a country in Europe.

Lithuania can also refer to:

Historical political entities 
Grand Duchy of Lithuania (1236–1795)
Kingdom of Lithuania (1251–63)
Duchy of Lithuania (13th century–1413)
Kingdom of Lithuania (1918)
Republic of Central Lithuania (1920-1922)

Other uses 
Lithuania (European Parliament constituency)
Sports teams listed in :Category:National sports teams of Lithuania, and called "Lithuania"
"Lithuania", a song by Big Sean from Detroit 2

See also 
Lithuania Minor, an ethnographically Lithuanian region in Prussia
Lituanica, an airplane flown from the United States across the Atlantic Ocean by Lithuanian pilots Steponas Darius and Stasys Girėnas in 1933